Luis Leandro Sosa Otermin (born 18 March 1991) is a Uruguayan professional footballer who plays as a left-back for Danubio.

Career
Sosa's club career started in 2011 with Uruguayan Primera División side Danubio after he was promoted from the club's youth system. He made his Danubio debut on 10 September in a 1–1 draw versus Nacional. From his debut in 2011–12 to the end of the 2012–13 season, he had played in fifteen league games for Danubio. In the following season, 2013–14, he participated in twelve Primera División matches for Danubio as the club won the title; he also scored two goals in 2013–14, including a goal in the championship playoff final against Montevideo Wanderers. In August 2014, Sosa made his Copa Sudamericana debut in a loss to Deportivo Capiatá.

Fifty-two appearances and four goals followed in all competitions for Sosa in 2014–15 and 2015–16. On 8 July 2016, Sosa left Danubio and joined Argentine Primera División club Aldosivi. He made his Aldosivi debut on 25 September versus Lanús. Twenty-five appearances followed, prior to Sosa rejoining Danubio in August 2017. His 100th career league appearance arrived on 3 December versus Boston River. On 9 July 2019, Danubio announced Sosa was set to depart for Greek football on loan. Xanthi, of Super League Greece, were revealed as his next team on 13 July.

Career statistics
.

Honours
Danubio
 Uruguayan Primera División: 2013–14

References

External links

1991 births
Living people
Footballers from Montevideo
Uruguayan footballers
Uruguayan expatriate footballers
Association football defenders
Uruguayan Primera División players
Argentine Primera División players
Danubio F.C. players
Aldosivi footballers
Xanthi F.C. players
Expatriate footballers in Argentina
Expatriate footballers in Greece
Uruguayan expatriate sportspeople in Argentina
Uruguayan expatriate sportspeople in Greece